Manouchehr Mohammadi (Persian: منوچهر محمدی; born in 1956 in Abadan, Iran) is an Iranian film producer. He graduated in sociology from Tehran University; began film producing with Hey, Joe! (1988, M. Asgari-Nasab). Founded a production company, Sina Film, along with Seifollah Daad and Manouchehr Asgari-Nasab. He was the Director of Supervision on Filmmaking in Ministry of Culture and Islamic Guidance (1997-2000).

Partial filmography 
 The Singer Cat (co), 1990
 I Love the Earth (co)
 The Spouse (co), 1993
 The Survivor (co), 1995
 Traveler of Rey
 Under the Moonlight, 2001
 Low Heights, 2002
 The Lizard, 2004

References

External links
 

1956 births
Living people
Iranian film producers
Producers who won the Audience Choice of Best Film Crystal Simorgh